The Terme di Saturnia are a group of springs located in the municipality of Manciano in Italy, a few kilometers from the village of Saturnia. The springs that feed the baths, which are found in the south-eastern valley, cover a vast territory that stretches from Mount Amiata and the hills of Fiora and Albegna rivers to the Maremma grossetana at Roselle (Terme di Roselle) and Talamone (Terme dell'Osa).

Toponym
One legend, according to the Etruscans and Romans, was that the Terme di Saturnia were formed by lightning bolts, thrown by Jupiter. During a violent quarrel between the two mythological deities, the bolts thrown towards Saturn had missed, causing the formations.

Thermal waters 
The sulphurous spring water is at a temperature of around 37.5 °C (99.5 °F). The main thermal waterfalls are the Mill Falls, located at an old mill as well as the Waterfalls of Gorello.

The yield of the source is about 800 liters per second, which guarantees an optimal replacement of water. The chemical make-up is sulfur, carbon, sulfate, bicarbonate-alkaline, earth, with the presence of hydrogen sulfide gas and carbon dioxide. The minerals dissolved in water amount to 2.79 grams per liter.

The area of Saturnia Spa contains a luxury spa of Terme di Saturnia.

See also 
Saturnia
Manciano

Bibliography
Aldo Mazzolai. Guida della Maremma. Percorsi tra arte e natura. Florence, Le Lettere, 1997.

External links

 Saturnia Tuscan Hot Springs
Terme di Saturnia official site
Tourism in Terme di Saturnia
Tourism in Terme di Saturnia travel blog
Dove in Toscana - Discovering Tuscany: Saturnia

Province of Grosseto
Saturnia (Terme)
Geography of Tuscany
Manciano
Hot springs of Italy